Nicholas Ernest de Firmian (born July 26, 1957) is an American chess player who received the FIDE title of Grandmaster (GM) in 1985. He is a three-time U.S. chess champion, winning in 1987 (with Joel Benjamin), 1995, and 1998. He also tied for first in 2002, but Larry Christiansen won the playoff. He is also a chess writer, most famous for his work in writing the 13th, 14th, and 15th editions of the important chess opening treatise Modern Chess Openings. He was born in Fresno, California.

He has represented the United States at several Interzonals and played on the United States Olympiad teams of 1980, 1984, 1986, 1988, 1990, 1996, 1998, and 2000. De Firmian earned the International Master title in 1979 and the GM title in 1985. Beginning in the 1990s, he lived for many years in Denmark. He currently resides in California.

He won the 1983 Canadian Open Chess Championship. In 1986, he won the World Open and the first prize of $21,000, at that time a record for a Swiss system tournament. De Firmian was a founding member of Prochess, a grandmaster advocacy group dedicated to promoting chess in the United States. He has a degree in physics from the University of California, Berkeley.

De Firmian is a noted expert on chess openings and in 1990 he revised Modern Chess Openings, 13th edition (MCO-13). In 1999 he wrote the 14th edition of Modern Chess Openings (MCO-14), which, along with Nunn's Chess Openings (NCO), is considered an outstanding single volume opening reference in English. He also helped prepare the chess opening book for the IBM Deep Blue team for its successful 1997 match with Garry Kasparov.

In 2006 he revised and expanded the classic 1921 book Chess Fundamentals, by José Capablanca. The edition was harshly criticized by chess historian Edward Winter, who claimed that de Firmian "destroyed" the book by changing Capablanca's writing and removing games from previous editions to include new games not played by Capablanca. De Firmian also wrote the 15th edition of MCO, published in April 2008.

Ca. 2012, de Firmian began a scholastic chess program with the Mechanics Institute in San Francisco.

Notable Game 

Nick de Firmian vs Predrag Nikolic, Tunis Interzonal (1985). de Firmian conducts an attack which ends with a complex mating combination.

Publications

References

External links
 
 
 
 

1957 births
Living people
American chess players
American chess writers
American male non-fiction writers
American instructional writers
Chess grandmasters
Chess theoreticians
Chess Olympiad competitors